Scythris schouteni is a moth of the family Scythrididae. It was described by Bengt Å. Bengtsson in 2014. It is found in Madagascar.

References

schouteni
Moths described in 2014